La Legión Extranjera (Spanish for "The Foreign Legion") was the main Asistencia, Asesoría y Administración heel group, though loosely affiliated. It was a catch all for one time and irregularly scheduled foreign heels, working as Konnan's hired guns as well as a number of AAA regular Rudos (bad guys). This allowed AAA to advertise matches where La Legión Extranjera is scheduled, without announcing the specific participants before the show.

La Legión Extranjera's leader was Konnan. At the end of 2006, he was put out of action by Cibernético (giving him time to take care of health issues.) Nicho el Millonario debuted in 2007 as the replacement leader, getting revenge for Konnan while he was recovering.

During the period Konnan worked for Total Nonstop Action Wrestling, many TNA wrestlers appeared in AAA as both members of La Legión Extranjera and as representing their promotions. Since he left TNA no contracted TNA wrestlers have worked for La Legión Extranjera. After being defeated in the main event of Triplemania XVII Legión Extrangera lost control of AAA and Konnan was suspended from Mexican wrestling for an indefinite time. At this time Legion Extrangera was dissolved leaving only Electroshock, Chessman and Kenzo Suzuki. Electroshock joined up with Silver King and Dr. Wagner, Jr. to form La Wagnermania while Kenzo Suzuki would form La Yakuza with El Orientál and Sugi San/Yoshitsune.

On August 21, 2009, Konnan returned with a new Legion, built around Teddy Hart, Nicole, Roxxi, Rain and Jennifer Blade. They were later joined by Alex Koslov and El Zorro, who returned to the stable after turning on them in the main event of TripleMania XVII. In March 2010 Dorian Roldan turned on his father, AAA president Joaquin Roldan, and became the new co-leader of La Legión Extranjera. In July 2010 Decnnis started a new sub-group called La Milicia (the militia) within the Legion, consisting of himself, Alan Stone, Chris Stone, Black Abyss, Psicosis II, Tigre Cota and Billy Boy. Both groups then became a part of Dorian Roldan's La Sociedad, along with Los Maniacos and Los Perros del Mal.

Guest members 
Over the years La Legión has been used as the storyline reason for foreign wrestlers competing for AAA, even if just for one or two appearances. Besides Konnan and Nicho, only Kenzo Suzuki and Headhunter A were regulars early in 2007. Both X-Pac and Ron Killings became regulars with the unit (and promotion) in mid-2007, and Sabu frequently appeared with them as well.

 A.J. Styles
 Angel Williams/Angelina Love
 Antifaz Del Norte
 Black Búfalo
 Black Magic
 Black Pearl
 Bobby Lashley
 Bryan Danielson
 Christy Hemme
 D'Angelo Dinero
 Elix Skipper
 El Padrino
 Frankie Kazarian
 Gran Hamada
 Gunner
 Headhunter B
 Histeria
 Homicide
 Jennifer Blake
 Josh Raymond
 Lance Hoyt
 Lorelei Lee
 Low Ki
 Magnus
 Mike Modest
 Mickie James
 Mr. Anderson
 Mr. Niebla
 Rellik
 Rhino
 Rikishi
 Rob Terry
 Rob Van Dam
 Roxxi
 Scott D'Amore
 Scott Steiner
 Sexy Star
 Shawn Daivari
 Tiana Ringer
 Traci Brooks
 Scott Hall
 Velvet Sky

Championships and accomplishments 
 AAA / Lucha Libre AAA Worldwide
 AAA Reina de Reinas Championship (1 time) – Sexy Star
 AAA Mega Championship (2 times) – El Zorro (1) and Jeff Jarrett (1)
 AAA World Mixed Tag Team Championship (1 time) – Alex Koslov and Christina Von Eerie
 AAA World Tag Team Championship (2 times) – Takeshi Morishima and Taiji Ishimori (1), and Abyss and Chessman (1)
 Reina de Reinas (2012) – Sexy Star
 Rey de Reyes (3 times) – El Zorro (2008), Electroshock (2009), and Chessman (2010)

References 

Lucha Libre AAA Worldwide teams and stables